Below is a list of common and eponymous plastic surgery flaps with their classification and common usage. (NB - the terms interpolation flap and pedicle flap can be used interchangeably.)

List of flaps

See also
 Flap (surgery)
 Perforator flaps

References

Plastic surgical procedures